Mashhad Torqi or Mashhad Tarqi may refer to:
 Mashhad Torqi-ye Olya
 Mashhad Torqi-ye Sofla